Clepsis danilevskyi is a species of moth of the family Tortricidae. It is found in Russia (northern European Russia, Mongun-Taiga in Siberia) and Alaska.

The wingspan is 18–23 mm. The ground colour of the forewings is ochreous yellow with a reddish chocolate brown pattern. The hindwings are dark grey with deep pinkish-yellow granulation near the apex and along the outer margin. Adults have been recorded on wing in July.

Etymology
The species is named in honour of Professor Alexsandr Sergeevich Danilevskii.

References

Moths described in 1973
Clepsis